Middle River may be:

Places

Australia
Middle River, South Australia, a locality on Kangaroo Island

Canada
 Middle River, British Columbia, formerly Middle River Village, a settlement in the Omineca Country of the Central Interior of British Columbia, Canada

United States
Middle River, Maryland
Middle River, Minnesota
Middle River, Wisconsin

Rivers

Australia
Middle River (South Australia), a river in the north of Kangaroo Island

United States
Middle River (Alabama)
Middle River (California)
Middle River (Iowa)
Middle River (Maine)
Middle River (Maryland)
Middle River (Massachusetts), a tributary of the Blackstone River
Middle River (Minnesota)
Middle River (Missouri River tributary)
Middle River (North Carolina), a major water body in Bertie County, North Carolina
Middle River (Virginia)
Middle River (Wisconsin), a river in the United States

Canada
Middle River (British Columbia), a river in the Omineca Country in the Central Interior of British Columbia, Canada
Middle River (New Brunswick), a river near the City of Bathurst, New Brunswick, Canada
The Kinbasket River (previously Middle River), a tributary of the Columbia River via the Kinbasket Lake reservoir in southeastern British Columbia, Canada

Isle of Man
Middle River (Isle of Man)

See also 
 Middle (disambiguation)